The 2025 U Sports Men's Volleyball Championship is scheduled to be held March 14–16, 2024, in Brandon, Manitoba, to determine a national champion for the 2024–25 U Sports men's volleyball season.

Host
The tournament is scheduled to be hosted by Brandon University at the University Healthy Living Centre on the school's campus. This would be the first time that Brandon has hosted the tournament.

Scheduled teams
Canada West Representative
OUA Representative
RSEQ Representative
Host (Brandon Bobcats)
Four additional berths

Championship bracket

Consolation bracket

References

External links 
 Tournament Web Site

U Sports volleyball
2025 in men's volleyball
Brandon University